WALL-E (promoted with an interpunct as WALL•E) is an American animation film released in 2008 and directed by Andrew Stanton. Walt Disney Pictures released it in the United States and Canada on June 27, 2008, grossing $23.1 million on its opening day, and $63 million during its opening weekend in 3,992 theaters, ranking number 1 at the box office. It eventually grossed $223 million domestically and $533 million worldwide. WALL-E received critical acclaim, with an approval rating of 95% on the review aggregator Rotten Tomatoes.

The film was nominated for several awards, including seven Annie Awards, six Academy Awards, and two Golden Globe Awards. WALL-E did not win any of the Annie Awards, all of them awarded to categories competitor Kung Fu Panda. It won the Academy Award for Best Animated Feature and was nominated for  Best Original Song, Best Original Score, Sound Mixing, Sound Editing and Best Original Screenplay at the 81st Academy Awards. Walt Disney Pictures pushed for an Academy Award for Best Picture nomination, but it was not nominated, sparking controversy over whether the academy deliberately restricted WALL-E to the Best Animated Feature category. Film critic Peter Travers remarked, "If there was ever a time where an animated feature deserved to be nominated for best picture it's Wall-E."

The feature has won Best Picture from the Boston Society of Film Critics, the Chicago Film Critics Association, the Online Film Critics Society, and the Los Angeles Film Critics Association, where it became the first animated feature to win that award. It also became the first animated film to win Best Editing for a Comedy or Musical from the American Cinema Editors. The character WALL-E was listed at #63 on Empires 2008 online poll of the 100 greatest movie characters. Time listed WALL-E number 1 in its top 10 movies of 2008, praising the directors' achievement in connecting with a large audience even though the characters have nearly no dialogue. In early 2010, Time ranked WALL-E number 1 in "Best Movies of the Decade." In 2016, the film was voted 29th out of 100 films regarded as the best of the 21st century by 117 film critics from around the world.

Accolades

Notes

References

External links

 

Lists of accolades by film
Pixar awards and nominations
Accolades